Dink (styled DINK), was an alternative/industrial rock band formed in Kent, Ohio in 1992. The band combined elements of industrial, Hip Hop (rapped vocals and extensive use of samples), hard rock, and electronic dance.  Dink's members included Sean Carlin (guitar, vocals, programming), Rob Lightbody (vocals, guitar), Jer Herring (guitar, vocals), Jeff Finn (bass), and Jan Eddy Van Der Kuil (drums).

History
Dink initially released 3 EPs in the early 1990s. These EPs were exclusively printed on cassettes. The band eventually released one self-titled album, also mostly self-produced, in 1994 on Capitol Records. The release peaked at #31 on Billboard's Heatseekers Albums chart. It featured one song produced by Skinny Puppy's Dave "Rave" Ogilvie (although he also mixed 8 out of the 10 songs). The song "Green Mind" was a hit, featuring some play on MTV and in the films Fear and Double Dragon, and was also remixed by Sascha Konietzko of KMFDM on the promo single. "Green Mind" also charted on the Billboard Modern Rock Tracks chart in early 1995 at No. 35, staying on the chart for 6 weeks. It also reached the Bubbling Under Hot 100 chart at No. 18.

The band's next two singles, "Angels" (which was featured in the film Bad Boys during the Club Hell scene) and "Get on It" also were released. Dink toured briefly with bands such as Pop Will Eat Itself, KMFDM, and Lords of Acid to further promote their debut. The band toured with Pop Will Eat Itself and Compulsion from November 17 to December 17, 1994. The band also contributed the song "USA Sex" to the mid-1990s compilation It Was Made in Northeast Ohio.

Dink recorded a follow up album, also on Capitol in 1995, and some of the songs would be released on the limited edition EP Blame It on Tito, which was released in 1996. The EP included a cover of the Neil Young song "Ohio" as well. The band then recorded additional songs for a second album to be released in late 1997 or early 1998, but was dropped by Capitol due to the changing musical climate. This led to the band's break up in 1998.

In 2014, film director Jorge Delarosa released a Dink documentary both on DVD and online, titled Gangrene: The Dink Documentary. 4 out of the 5 band members were interviewed for the documentary. Also around this time, the full length version of the scrapped album Blame It on Tito was leaked/released online, consisting of 13 songs. Sean Carlin, Jan Eddy Van Der Kuil, and Jeff Finn created a new band named K.I.N.D. (Killer Instinct Never Dies), along with long time friend Steve Gang. Although the band occasionally plays live shows, it is mostly dormant as of 2018. A few songs were released on the band's official ReverbNation page.

Members
Sean Carlin – lead vocals, guitar, programming
Rob Lightbody – lead vocals, guitar
Jer Herring – guitar, backup vocals
Jeff Finn – bass
Jan Eddy Van Der Kuil – drums

Discography

Studio albums
Dink – 1994
Blame It on Tito – 2014 (recorded in 1996 and 1997)

EPs
Angels – 1993
Cops Are Baffled – 1993
Smile Honey – 1994
Blame It on Tito – 1996

References

Categories

Musical groups established in 1992
Musical groups disestablished in 1998
Musical groups from Kent, Ohio
American industrial rock musical groups
Alternative rock groups from Ohio